The Baliem Valley (also spelled Balim and sometimes known as the Grand Valley) is a valley of the Central Highlands in Western New Guinea. Specifically in Highland Papua, Indonesia. The main town in the valley is Wamena, which lies on the Baliem River.

The discovery of the Baliem Valley to the Western world and the unexpected presence of its large agricultural population was made by Richard Archbold’s third zoological expedition to New Guinea in 1938. On 21 June an aerial reconnaissance flight southwards from Hollandia (now Jayapura) found what the expedition called the "Grand Valley". Since then the valley has gradually been opened up to a limited amount of tourism, with Baliem Valley Festival (Festival Lembah Baliem) as a main tourist event.

When western anthropologists explored Baliem Valley in the 1940s and 1960s, they thought it was only populated by Dani people. However, further exploration to the east and south revealed that the valley was also inhabited by Yali people, Mek people, and Nduga people. During discussions by Dewan Adat Papua in 2002, it was decided that people living in Baliem Valley are called Hubula people, Walak people located to the north, and Lani people (Western Dani) located to the west.

The following is copied from the back cover of Peter Matthiessen’s book Under the Mountain Wall:
In the Baliem Valley in Central New Guinea live the Kurelu, a Stone Age tribe that survived into the twentieth century. Peter Matthiessen visited the Kurelu with the Harvard-Peabody Expedition in 1961 and wrote Under the Mountain Wall as an account not of the expedition, but of the great warrior Weaklekek, the swineherd Tukum, U-mue and his family, and the boy Weake, killed in a surprise raid. Matthiessen observes these people in their timeless rhythm of work and play and war, of gardening and wood gathering, feasts and funerals, pig stealing and ambush.

Airplane crash 
The valley was the site of the Gremlin Special airplane crash in 1945, which received a great deal of publicity at the time. In 2011, a book about the crash and rescue entitled Lost in Shangri-La was published.

See also

 Balim Valley languages

References

External links

 Photos from the Baliem Valley
 Story and Photos from Baliem Valley
 Baliem Valley Festival

Valleys of Indonesia
Landforms of Western New Guinea
Landforms of Highland Papua